Ron Schultz is a Homosassa, Florida Republican (United States) politician who serves as the District 43 Representative in the House of Representatives of the U.S. state of Florida. He was first elected to the Florida House on June 26, 2007, in a special election and was re-elected in 2008.

Schultz was born on December 20, 1938, in New York City, New York. He came to Florida in 1945. He attended Shimer College from 1955 to 1958. In 1965, he received a Bachelor of Arts degree from University of South Florida and received a Master of Arts degree from the university in 1967.

In 1976, he was appointed by Reubin Askew to serve as Pinellas County Property Appraiser, and served till 1998. Two years later, Bob Martinez appointed him Citrus County Property Appraiser, a position he held till 2005. In 1993, he became a Homosassa Special Water District Commissioner.

As a legislator, he sponsored four bills in 2008, of which one was signed into law. He was endorsed for re-election by the Florida Chamber of Commerce.

References

Sources
Project Vote Smart profile
Florida House of Representatives Profile

Republican Party members of the Florida House of Representatives
1938 births
Living people
Shimer College alumni
University of South Florida alumni
People from Citrus County, Florida
Politicians from New York City
Businesspeople from Florida